John George Galpin (13 January 1843 – 5 March 1917) was an English first-class cricketer. A right-handed batsman who bowled right-arm roundarm fast, he made his debut for Hampshire against Kent, taking figures of 4/37 in the match. In Galpin's second match against Sussex he took figures of 4/45 as Hampshire lost by an innings. In Galpin's third and final match of 1875 against Kent, Galpin took his maiden five wicket haul with figures of 6/68 as Hampshire again lost by an innings.

Galpin played a single match for Hampshire in 1876 against Derbyshire, where he took his second and final first-class five wicket haul with figures of 4/42.

In 1877 Galpin played two further matches for Hampshire, against the Marylebone Cricket Club and Kent. Galpin's final first-class match for Hampshire came in 1880 against Sussex. In Galpin's brief first-class career for Hampshire he took 28 wickets at a bowling average of 16.50, with two five wicket hauls and best figures of 6/68.

Galpin died at Luton, Bedfordshire on 5 March 1917.

External links
John Galpin at Cricinfo
John Galpin at CricketArchive

1843 births
1917 deaths
People from Gosport
English cricketers
Hampshire cricketers